The 1929 Duquesne Dukes football team was an American football team that represented Duquesne University as an independent during the 1929 college football season. In its third season under head coach Elmer Layden, Duquesne compiled a 9–0–1 record and outscored opponents by a total of 154 to 53.

Schedule

References

Duquesne
Duquesne Dukes football seasons
College football undefeated seasons
Duquesne Dukes football